Marshall County Schools is a school district headquartered in Lewisburg, Tennessee, serving all of Marshall County.

Schools
 High schools
 Cornersville High School
 Marshall County High School

 Middle schools
 Lewisburg Middle School

 Elementary schools
 Delk-Henson Intermediate School
 Chapel Hill Elementary School
 Cornersville Elementary School
 Marshall Elementary School
 Oak Grove Elementary School
 Westhills Elementary School

 Other
 Forrest School (alternative)
Spot Lowe Vocational Center

References

External links
 
School districts in Tennessee
Education in Marshall County, Tennessee